Tirabassi is an Italian surname. Notable people with the surname include:

 Giorgio Tirabassi, Italian actor and director
 Tony Tirabassi, Canadian politician
 Brice Tirabassi, French rally driver
 Daniele Tirabassi, Venezuelan swimmer

Italian-language surnames